KGTM is a hot adult contemporary formatted radio station located in Shelley, Idaho, broadcasting to the Eastern Idaho area on 98.1 FM.

History
KGTM had been silent since being purchased by Rich Broadcasting in October 2011. In November 2011, the then-KBJX started broadcasting a Christmas music format under the branding "106.3 The Elf". On January 4, 2012, KBJX changed their format to adult contemporary, branded as "EZ Rock 106.3". On June 21, 2012, KBJX changed their call letters to KQEZ to match the "EZ Rock" branding. KQEZ swapped call signs with co-owned KGTM on March 23, 2015, and changed their format to a simulcast of hot AC-formatted KLLP 98.5 FM Chubbuck, Idaho.

External links

GTM